Zizou Bergs (born 3 June 1999) is a Belgian professional tennis player. He has a career high ATP singles ranking of World No. 112 achieved on 6 February 2023. He also has a career high ATP doubles ranking of World No. 449 achieved on 25 October 2021. He is currently the No. 2 Belgian singles tennis player.

Professional career

2020: ATP debut and first win

Bergs made his ATP main draw debut at the 2020 European Open after receiving a wildcard for the singles main draw. In the first round, he recorded his first ATP victory by defeating Albert Ramos Viñolas in straight sets, before pushing world No. 17 Karen Khachanov to three sets.

2021: Three ATP Challenger titles, top 200 debut
Bergs won his first Challenger title at the 2021 Saint Petersburg Challenger in March and later on in the month, would win his second Challenger title at the 2021 Lille Challenger. In June, he won his third Challenger title at the 2021 Almaty Challenger.

After a second round showing at the 2021 Swiss Open Gstaad where he defeated fellow qualifier Oscar Otte in the first round, he reached the top 200 at World No. 196 on 26 July 2021.

2022: Fourth Challenger title, Grand Slam & top 150 debut
He reached his first final of the season at the Saint-Brieuc Challenger losing to Jack Draper (tennis).

In May, he reached his second Challenger final of the season at the 2022 Saturn Oil Open in Troisdorf, Germany, where he lost to Lukáš Klein.

Ranked No. 207, he won the 2022 Ilkley Trophy as a qualifier defeating lucky loser Alexei Popyrin in the semifinals and Jack Sock in the final. As a result he won the last 2022 Wimbledon wildcard where he made his Grand Slam debut. He also climbed more than 60 positions up the rankings to a new career-high of World No. 146 on 20 June 2022.

2023: United Cup and Australian Open debut
On his debut as the No. 2 player from Belgium, he lost his two singles matches at the inaugural 2023 United Cup against world No. 196 Bulgarian Dimitar Kuzmanov and world No. 803 Greek Stefanos Sakellaridis.

He made his debut by qualifying for the main draw at the 2023 Australian Open defeating another Bulgarian Adrian Andreev. In the first round of the main draw he lost to Serbian Laslo Djere.

He received a wildcard for the 2023 Miami Open main draw.

Future and Challenger finals

Singles: 15 (8–7)

Doubles 8 (4–4)

References

External links

 
 

1999 births
Living people
Belgian male tennis players
People from Lommel
People from Neerpelt
Sportspeople from Limburg (Belgium)